Bicycle Thieves (sometimes known in the United States as The Bicycle Thief) is a 1948 Italian neorealist drama film directed by Vittorio De Sica. It follows the story of a poor father searching in post-World War II Rome for his stolen bicycle, without which he will lose the job which was to be the salvation of his young family.

Adapted for the screen by Cesare Zavattini from the 1946 novel by Luigi Bartolini, and starring Lamberto Maggiorani as the desperate father and Enzo Staiola as his plucky young son, Bicycle Thieves received an Academy Honorary Award (most outstanding foreign language film) in 1950, and in 1952 was deemed the greatest film of all time by Sight & Sound magazine's poll of filmmakers and critics; fifty years later another poll organized by the same magazine ranked it sixth among the greatest-ever films. In the 2012 version of the list the film ranked 33rd among critics and 10th among directors.

The film was also cited by Turner Classic Movies as one of the most influential films in cinema history, and it is considered part of the canon of classic cinema. In 1958, the film was voted number 3 on the prestigious Brussels 12 list at the 1958 World Expo, and number 4 in Empire magazine's "The 100 Best Films of World Cinema" in 2010. It was also included on the Italian Ministry of Cultural Heritage’s 100 films to be saved, a list of 100 films that "have changed the collective memory of the country between 1942 and 1978."

Plot
In the post-World War II Val Melaina neighborhood of Rome, Antonio Ricci (Lamberto Maggiorani) is desperate for work to support his wife Maria (Lianella Carell), his son Bruno (Enzo Staiola) and his small baby. He is offered a job of pasting advertising bills but tells Maria that he cannot accept because the job requires a bicycle. Maria resolutely strips the bed of her dowry bedsheetsprized possessions for a poor familyand takes them to the pawn shop, where they bring enough to redeem Antonio's pawned bicycle.

On his first day of work, Antonio is atop a ladder when a young man (Vittorio Antonucci) snatches the bicycle. Antonio gives chase but is thrown off the trail by the thief's confederates. The police warn that there is little they can do. 

Advised that stolen goods often surface at the Piazza Vittorio market, Antonio goes there with several friends and Bruno. They find a bicycle frame that might be Antonio's, but the sellers refuse to allow them to examine the serial number. They call an officer over who reads the serial number to them (it does not match) but won't allow them to see the number for themselves.

At the Porta Portese market, Antonio and Bruno spot the thief with an old man. The thief eludes them and the old man feigns ignorance. They follow him into a church where he too slips away from them.

In a subsequent encounter with the thief, Antonio pursues him into a brothel, whose denizens eject them. In the street, hostile neighbors gather as Antonio accuses the thief, who conveniently falls into a fit for which the crowd blames Antonio. Bruno fetches a policeman, who searches the thief's apartment without success. The policeman tells Antonio the case is weakAntonio has no witnesses and the neighbors are certain to provide the thief with an alibi. Antonio and Bruno leave in despair amid jeers and threats from the crowd.

On their way home, they are walking near Stadio Nazionale PNF football stadium. Antonio sees an unattended bicycle near a doorway and after much anguished soul-searching, instructs Bruno to take the tram to a stop nearby and wait.  Antonio circles the unattended bicycle and jumps on it. Instantly the hue and cry is raised and Brunowho has missed the tramis stunned to see his father pursued, surrounded and pulled from the bicycle. As Antonio is being muscled toward the police station, the bicycle's owner notices Bruno and in a moment of compassion tells the others to release Antonio.

Antonio and Bruno then walk off slowly amid a buffeting crowd. Antonio fights back tears and Bruno takes his hand. The camera watches from behind as they disappear into the crowd.

Cast

Production
Bicycle Thieves is the best-known work of Italian neorealism, the movement that formally began with Roberto Rossellini's Rome, Open City (1945) and aimed to give cinema a new degree of realism. De Sica had just made Shoeshine (1946), but was unable to get financial backing from any major studio for the film, so he raised the money himself from friends. Wanting to portray the poverty and unemployment of post-war Italy, he co-wrote a script with Cesare Zavattini and others using only the title and few plot devices of a little-known novel of the time by poet and artist Luigi Bartolini. Following the precepts of neorealism, De Sica shot only on location (that is, no studio sets) and cast only untrained actors. (Lamberto Maggiorani, for example, was a factory worker.) That some actors' roles paralleled their lives off screen added realism to the film. De Sica cast Maggiorani when he had brought his young son to an audition for the film. He later cast the 8-year-old Enzo Staiola when he noticed the young boy watching the film's production on a street while helping his father sell flowers. The film's final shot of Antonio and Bruno walking away from the camera into the distance is an homage to many of the films of Charlie Chaplin, who was De Sica's favourite filmmaker.

Translated title

The original Italian title is Ladri di biciclette. It literally translates into English as "thieves of bicycles"; both ladri and biciclette are plural. In Bartolini's novel, the title referred to a post-war culture of rampant thievery and disrespect for civil order, countered only by an inept police force and indifferent allied occupiers.

When the film was screened in the United States in 1949, Bosley Crowther referred to it as The Bicycle Thief in his review in The New York Times, and this came to be the title by which the film was known in English. When the film was re-released in the late-1990s, San Francisco Chronicle film critic Bob Graham said that he preferred that version, stating, "Purists have criticized the English title of the film as a poor translation of the Italian ladri, which is plural. What blindness! The Bicycle Thief is one of those wonderful titles whose power does not sink in until the film is over". The 2007 Criterion Collection release in North America uses the title Bicycle Thieves.

Critical reception
When Bicycle Thieves was released in Italy, it was viewed with hostility and as portraying Italians in a negative way. Italian critic Guido Aristarco praised it, but also complained that "sentimentality might at times take the place of artistic emotion." Fellow Italian neorealist film director Luchino Visconti criticized the film, saying that it was a mistake to use a professional actor to dub over Lamberto Maggiorani's dialogue. Luigi Bartolini, the author of the novel from which de Sica drew his title, was highly critical of the film, feeling that the spirit of his book had been thoroughly betrayed because his protagonist was a middle-class intellectual and his theme was the breakdown of civil order.

Bicycle Thieves has continued to gain very high praise from critics, with the review aggregator website Rotten Tomatoes reporting 99% of 67 contemporary reviews as positive, with an average rating of 9.20/10. The site's critics consensus reads, "An Italian neorealism exemplar, Bicycle Thieves thrives on its non-flashy performances and searing emotion." The picture is also in the Vatican's Best Films List for portraying humanistic values.

Bosley Crowther, film critic for The New York Times, lauded the film and its message in his review. He wrote, "Again the Italians have sent us a brilliant and devastating film in Vittorio De Sica's rueful drama of modern city life, The Bicycle Thief. Widely and fervently heralded by those who had seen it abroad (where it already has won several prizes at various film festivals), this heart-tearing picture of frustration, which came to [the World Theater] yesterday, bids fair to fulfill all the forecasts of its absolute triumph over here. For once more the talented De Sica, who gave us the shattering Shoeshine, that desperately tragic demonstration of juvenile corruption in post-war Rome, has laid hold upon and sharply imaged in simple and realistic terms a majorindeed, a fundamental and universaldramatic theme. It is the isolation and loneliness of the little man in this complex social world that is ironically blessed with institutions to comfort and protect mankind". Pierre Leprohon wrote in Cinéma D'Aujourd that "what must not be ignored on the social level is that the character is shown not at the beginning of a crisis but at its outcome. One need only to look at his face, his uncertain gait, his hesitant or fearful attitudes to understand that Ricci is already a victim, a diminished man who has lost his confidence." Lotte Eisner called it the best Italian film since World War II and Robert Winnington called it "the most successful record of any foreign film in British cinema."

When the film was re-released in the late 1990s Bob Graham, staff film critic for the San Francisco Chronicle, gave the drama a positive review: "The roles are played by non-actors, Lamberto Maggiorani as the father and Enzo Staiola as the solemn boy, who sometimes appears to be a miniature man. They bring a grave dignity to De Sica's unblinking view of post-war Italy. The wheel of life turns and grinds people down; the man who was riding high in the morning is brought low by nightfall. It is impossible to imagine this story in any other form than De Sica's. The new black-and-white print has an extraordinary range of grey tones that get darker as life closes in". In 1999, Chicago Sun-Times film reviewer Roger Ebert wrote that "The Bicycle Thief" is so well-entrenched as an official masterpiece that it is a little startling to visit it again after many years and realize that it is still alive and has strength and freshness. Given an honorary Oscar in 1949, routinely voted one of the greatest films of all time, revered as one of the foundation stones of Italian neorealism, it is a simple, powerful film about a man who needs a job". Ebert added the film to his "Great Movies" list. In 2020, A. O. Scott praised the film in an essay entitled "Why You Should Still Care About 'Bicycle Thieves'."

Bicycle Thieves is a fixture on the British Film Institute's Sight & Sound critics' and directors' polls of the greatest films ever made. The film ranked 1st and 7th on critics' poll in 1952 and 1962 respectively. It ranked 11th on the magazine's 1992 Critics' poll, 45th in 2002 Critics' Poll and 6th on the 2002 Directors' Top Ten Poll. It was slightly lower in the 2012 directors' poll, 10th and 33rd on the 2012 critics' poll. The Village Voice ranked the film at number 37 in its Top 250 "Best Films of the Century" list in 1999, based on a poll of critics. The film was voted at No. 99 on the list of "100 Greatest Films" by the prominent French magazine Cahiers du cinéma in 2008.

The Japanese filmmaker Akira Kurosawa cited this movie as one of his 100 favorite films.

Legacy
Many directors have cited it as a major influence including Satyajit Ray, Ken Loach, Giorgio Mangiamele, Bimal Roy, Anurag Kashyap, Balu Mahendra, Vetrimaaran and Basu Chatterjee.

The film was noteworthy for film directors of the Iranian New Wave, such as Jafar Panahi and Dariush Mehrjui.

The film was one of 39 foreign films recommended by Martin Scorsese.

Filipino action star Nelson Anderson said it was the favorite Italian neorealist film of his contemporary Weng Weng, who cried upon his first viewing in the early 1980s. In a project that never materialized, they intended to depart from their usual fare by remaking it as an action-comedy with a human touch.

It was parodied in the film The Icicle Thief (1989).

The film features in the 1992 Robert Altman film The Player. In this film Griffin Mill (played by Tim Robbins), a Hollywood studio executive, tracks screenwriter David Kahane (played by Vincent D'Onofrio) to a screening of Bicycle Thieves, and stages what he represents as a chance meeting with Kahane. Kahane's suspicion is roused by the fact that Mill entered the screening only in the last few minutes of the film, and the two have an argument afterwards, resulting in Kahane's death. Anyone otherwise unaware viewing the last few minutes of Bicycle Thieves - comprising Antonio's attempted theft - would gain a distorted perspective on Antonio's motives, just as Mill misjudges Kahane, whom he wrongly thinks has been sending him hate mail.

Norman Loftis's film Messenger (1994)  is considered to be a remake of Bicycle Thieves.

Stage adaptation

A theatrical adaptation of the film was created by Littlebrain Theatre, in a devised adaptation with a cast of nine. The production premiered as part of the Rhinoceros Theatre Festival in Chicago, from January 18 to February 22, 2019.

Awards
 Locarno International Film Festival, Switzerland: Special Prize of the Jury, Vittorio De Sica; 1949.
 National Board of Review: NBR Award, Best Director, Vittorio De Sica; Best Film (Any Language), Italy; 1949.
 New York Film Critics Circle Awards: NYFCC Award, Best Foreign Language Film, Italy; 1949.
 Academy Awards: Honorary Award, as The Bicycle Thief (Italy). Voted by the Academy Board of Governors as the most outstanding foreign language film released in the United States during 1949; 1950.
 Academy Awards: Nominated, Oscar, Best Writing, Screenplay; as The Bicycle Thief, Cesare Zavattini; 1950.
 British Academy of Film and Television Arts: BAFTA Film Award, Best Film from any Source; 1950.
 Bodil Awards, Copenhagen, Denmark: Bodil, Best European Film (Bedste europæiske film), Vittorio De Sica; 1950.
 Golden Globes: Golden Globe, Best Foreign Film, Italy; 1950.
 Cinema Writers Circle Awards, Spain: CEC Award, Best Foreign Film (Mejor Película Extranjera), Italy; 1951.
 Kinema Junpo Awards, Tokyo, Japan: Kinema Junpo Award, Best Foreign Language Film, Vittorio De Sica; 1951.
 Best Cinematography (Migliore Fotografia), Carlo Montuori.
 Best Director (Migliore Regia), Vittorio De Sica.
 Best Film (Miglior Film a Soggetto).
 Best Score (Miglior Commento Musicale), Alessandro Cicognini.
 Best Screenplay (Migliore Sceneggiatura), Cesare Zavattini, Vittorio De Sica, Suso Cecchi d'Amico, Oreste Biancoli, Adolfo Franci, and Gerardo Guerrieri.
 Best Story (Miglior Soggetto), Cesare Zavattini.
 Listed as one of TCM's top 15 most influential films list, as The Bicycle Thief (1947),
 Ranked #4 in Empire magazines "The 100 Best Films Of World Cinema" in 2010.
Voted #2 in BBC Culture's poll of 209 critics in 43 countries for the greatest foreign-language film of all time.

See also
 List of films considered the best

References

External links

 
  (German dialogue)
Bicycle Thieves: A Passionate Commitment to the Real an essay by Godfrey Cheshire at the Criterion Collection
Bicycle Thieves: Ode to the Common Man an essay by Charles Burnett at the Criterion Collection
  by A. O. Scott (The New York Times) at YouTube
 

1948 films
1948 drama films
Italian drama films
Italian neorealist films
1940s Italian-language films
Italian black-and-white films
Films based on Italian novels
Films about Catholicism
Films set in Rome
Best Foreign Language Film Academy Award winners
Films awarded an Academy Honorary Award
Best Film BAFTA Award winners
Films about poverty
Films directed by Vittorio De Sica
Films with screenplays by Cesare Zavattini
Films with screenplays by Suso Cecchi d'Amico
Films scored by Alessandro Cicognini
Films about father–son relationships
1940s Italian films